Lights Out is the second studio album by American rapper Lil Wayne. It was released on December 19, 2000, by Cash Money Records and Universal Records. The album peaked at number 16 on the US Billboard 200 chart. The album was certified gold by the Recording Industry Association of America (RIAA).

Commercial performance
Lights Out debuted at number 24 on the US Billboard 200 chart, during on the week of January 6, 2001. The album also debuted at number two on the US Top R&B/Hip-Hop Albums chart, becoming Wayne's second top-ten album on that chart. It moved 205,000 units in its debut week. In its second week, the album reached its peak position at number 16 on the chart dated January 13, 2001. As of June 21, 2001, the album was certified gold by the Recording Industry Association of America (RIAA) for sales of over 500,000 copies in the United States. As of May 2013, the album has sold approximately a million copies in the United States.

Track listing
All songs produced by Mannie Fresh.

Personnel
 Pen & Pixel - Cover art

Charts

Weekly charts

Year-end charts

Certifications

References

2000 albums
Lil Wayne albums
Cash Money Records albums
Albums produced by Mannie Fresh